SPA London is a registered charity based in North London which was established about 1975 in the United Kingdom. SPA stands for Shree Prajapati Association and this is the London arm of the charity. There are 13 branches throughout the UK and there are also branches in other countries like Canada and South Africa.

The charity was already a thriving community in East Africa but the community re-established itself here in the UK by the Indians who were forced to leave East Africa due to the hostile political conditions for the Asian population generally. The community originated in the Surat and Valsad district of the West Indian state of Gujarat.

The charity continues its aims of helping other charities including UK based charities such as NSPCC, Breast Cancer, and RNLI as well as forging links with charities in India such as the Rotary Eye Hospital in Navsari, Gujarat.

SPA London has over 2000 members and has a community centre which is situated at 519 North Circular Road in Neasdon.

Charities based in London